The Silurian is the geological period and system lasting roughly from 445 million years ago to 415 million years ago.

Silurian may also refer to:

 Silurian, the society, culture, language, and ethnicity of the Silures, an ancient Welsh tribe
 Silurian, the racehorse that won the 1923 Doncaster Cup
 Silurian Press Club, the society established at 1924 by a group of maverick Park Row newspaper veterans
 Silurian (Doctor Who), a fictional race of humanoid reptiles who existed before humanity
 Silurian hypothesis, a hypothesis that speculates on the possibility of a prior advanced civilization on Earth
 Silurian Hills, a small range of hills in the Mojave Desert
 Siluria Technologies, a San Francisco-based technology company
 Eriopygodes imbecilla, the Silurian, a moth of the family Noctuidae